Kósz is a Hungarian surname. Notable people with the surname include:

Zoltán Kósz (born 1967), Hungarian water polo player
Zsolt Kosz (born 1992), Romanian figure skater

Hungarian-language surnames